Fabrizio  Tonello (born 1951) is professor at University of Padua and teaches Public opinion sciences. He has been Visiting Fellow of Columbia University in New York.

He previously taught at the Communication studies department of University of Bologna and at the International School for Advanced Studies in Trieste.

Books
 Da Saigon an Oklahoma City (Arezzo-Milano 1996)
 La nuova macchina dell'informazione (Feltrinelli 1999)
 Il giornalismo americano (Roma 2005)
 La fabbrica dei mostri book coupled with DVD Una storia americana
 Il nazionalismo americano (UTET 2007)

References
 Tonello's page at University of Padua
 Tonello's biography at zivago.com

Italian political scientists
1951 births
Academic staff of the University of Padua
Columbia University faculty
Academic staff of the University of Bologna
Living people